"No Basta" (English: It's Not Enough) is a song written, produced and performed by Italo-Venezuelan singer-songwriter Franco De Vita. It was released by CBS Discos and as the first single from Franco De Vita's studio album Extranjero (1990), becoming his first number-one single in the Billboard Top Latin Songs chart. The song "conveys a poignant message about children needing love, not just material possessions." The music video recorded for the song earned the International Viewer's Choice Award at the 1991 MTV Video Music Awards. The singer decided to donate the award to a campaign against discrimination in the United States. The video received a Billboard Music nomination for Latin Video of the Year by a Male Artist.

The song debuted in the Billboard Top Latin Songs chart (formerly Hot Latin Tracks) chart at number 26 in the week of February 9, 1991, climbing to the top ten three weeks later. "No Basta" peaked at number-one on March 30, 1991, replacing "Sopa de Caracol" by Honduran musical ensemble Banda Blanca and being succeeded by "Mi Deseo" by Mexican band Los Bukis, six weeks later. "No Basta" ended 1991 as the eighth best performing Latin single of the year in the United States.

See also
 List of number-one Billboard Hot Latin Tracks of 1991
 Billboard Top Latin Songs Year-End Chart

References

1990 singles
1990 songs
Franco De Vita songs
Spanish-language songs
Songs written by Franco De Vita
CBS Discos singles
1990s ballads
Pop ballads
Rock ballads
Songs about parenthood